Paulius Saudargas (born 13 March 1979 in Kaunas) is a physicist, Deputy Speaker of the Seimas, Member of the Seimas for the Justiniškės constituency since 2008 and holds a PhD in biophysics.

Biography
In 2001 graduated from the Faculty of Physics of Vilnius University, obtained a bachelor's degree in physics and a qualification of a physics teacher. In 2003 he obtained a master's degree in biophysics at Vilnius University, and in 2007 a PhD in biophysics, specialising in photoelectric, electroacoustic and spectroscopic studies of bacteriorhodopsin.

From 1999 to 2000, he was a senior specialist in the Second Department of Operational Services under the Ministry of National Defense of Lithuania. In 2003, he worked as an engineer in the Laboratory of Electrical Quantities of the Institute of Semiconductor Physics. Between 2002 and 2007 (intermittently) he was an engineer in the Laboratory of Molecular Derivatives Physics of the Institute of Physics. Field of work – research of light-sensitive proteins by spectroscopic, photoelectric and electroacoustic methods.

Political life
From 2004 to 2005, he was a member of the board of the Young Christian Democrats. Between 2005 and 2007, Saudargas was a member of the board of the Lithuanian Council of Youth Organizations (LiJOT) and the Chairman of the Ethics Committee.

He is member of the Homeland Union – Lithuanian Christian Democrats, since 2007 until 2008 was deputy executive xecretary.

Since 2008 Saudargas is member of the Seimas, elected in Justiniškės constituency.

References

1979 births
Living people
Homeland Union politicians
Members of the Seimas
21st-century Lithuanian politicians
Lithuanian physicists
Biophysicists
Politicians from Kaunas
Vilnius University alumni